Pablo Marcelo Bezombe (born 4 June 1971 in Santa Fe) is a retired Argentine football midfielder. Bezombe began his career with Newell's Old Boys, making his debut against Independiente on 7 March 1993.  In July 1999, Bezombe joined Mexican Primera División side Monarcas Morelia.

References

External links
 Pablo Bezombe – Argentine Primera Statistics at Fútbol XXI 
 

1971 births
Living people
Footballers from Santa Fe, Argentina
Argentine footballers
Association football midfielders
Newell's Old Boys footballers
Unión de Santa Fe footballers
Racing Club de Avellaneda footballers
Estudiantes de La Plata footballers
Club Atlético Belgrano footballers
Tiro Federal footballers
Central Córdoba de Rosario footballers
Atlético Morelia players
Deportivo Italia players
Santiago Wanderers footballers
Argentine Primera División players
Liga MX players
Argentine expatriate footballers
Expatriate footballers in Chile
Expatriate footballers in Mexico
Expatriate footballers in Venezuela
Argentine expatriate sportspeople in Chile
Argentine expatriate sportspeople in Mexico
Argentine expatriate sportspeople in Venezuela